Delacombe is a large and rapidly growing industrial/residential suburb on the south west rural-urban fringe of Ballarat, Victoria, Australia.

Delacombe forms a large part of the Ballarat West Growth Area where suburban development is encouraged by the City of Ballarat and State Government of Victoria.  Much of the city's planned subdivision for new housing estates is happening in Greenfield land in and around the suburb and it is predicted to be home to over 12,000 residents in 2030.

The suburb is built upon the floodplain of the Winter Creek.  Its tributaries are stormwater drains, including the Banyule.

It is one of the few Ballarat suburbs with its own shopping centres and a future activity centre for the suburb is planned by the City of Ballarat.

It was named in 1965 after the then incumbent Governor of Victoria, Sir Rohan Delacombe.

History
Delacombe was originally part of Ballarat West and situated in the Shire of Grenville. The first development was a factory producing guncotton for World War II.  Over the decades, industry expanded in the area.

In 1965 the Department of Crown Lands proposed it be named in honour of then governor Rohan Delacombe and the naming was passed by the shire.

As Ballarat's urban area expanded, the first residential subdivisions occurred in the following decades and the primary school opened in 1981.

During the 2011 Victorian floods, flash flooding caused the Banyule drain overflowed on more than one occasion, causing flooding to homes.  The floods spurred implement stormwater upgrades and a flood strategy from the City of Ballarat including the creation of artificial wetlands.

Urban form and housing
The majority of Delacombe's residential areas have been developed under the concepts of street hierarchy with light industry and commercial areas centred on the main streets with single-family detached homes along branching cul-de-sacs.

The Delacombe Town Centre shopping centre is located on the south-western edge of Delacombe.  It was opened on 31 August 2017.

Education
 Lumen Christi Catholic school which is located at 111 Whitelaw Ave, Delacombe Vic 3356
 Delacombe Primary School which is located at 110-120 Greenhalghs Rd, Delacombe Vic 3356

Transport
The main form of transport in Delacombe is the private motor car and it can be classed as a car dependent suburb and over 50% of all households with more than two vehicles.  The suburb is serviced by Ballarat taxis and the Route 25 bus service operates to the city.

A branch of the disused Cattleyards freight railway line terminated in Delacombe and was proposed by the Victorian Greens transport policy as the site of a potential railway station, however the line was demolished in 2010.  The nearest railway station is Wendouree 5 km to the north.

Parks and open space
While there is still much greenfield land in Delacombe, currently the Delacombe Sports Centre is set aside as a public recreation space.

The Delacombe wetlands are currently under construction.  Storm water from the recent housing developments will create this into a vibrant flora and fauna area.

References

Suburbs of Ballarat